The John Williams House is a home in Savannah, Georgia, United States. It is located at 17 West Jones Street and was constructed in 1883.

The building is part of the Savannah Historic District, and in a survey by the Historic Savannah Foundation, the building was found to be of significant status.

See also
Buildings in Savannah Historic District

References

Houses in Savannah, Georgia
Houses completed in 1883
Savannah Historic District